Emma Adamo (born c. 1963) is a British businesswoman.

Early life
Emma Adamo was born circa 1963. She graduated from Stanford University and received an M.B.A. from the INSEAD.

Career
Adamo has sat on the Board of Directors of Associated British Foods, a British multinational food processing and retailing company, since 9 December 2011, replacing Galen Weston (1940–2021). She also sits on the Board of Directors of Wittington Investments, a privately owned investment company.

References

Living people
1960s births
Stanford University alumni
INSEAD alumni
English businesspeople
Associated British Foods people